Hanoch Yelon (born 1886; died 18 January 1970) was an Israeli linguist and leading Talmudic researcher.

Biography
Yelon was born in 1886 in a small village in Galicia, then part of Austria-Hungary (later part of Poland and now in Ukraine).

Following the end of World War I, he moved to Vienna and in 1921, he emigrated to Mandate Palestine, living in Jerusalem.

Yelon, an expert in Mishnaic Hebrew and grammar, vocalized the text in Hanoch Albeck's edition of the Mishnah.

Awards 
 In 1962, Yelon was awarded the Israel Prize for Jewish studies.

See also 
List of Israel Prize recipients

References 

1886 births
1970 deaths
Jews from Galicia (Eastern Europe)
Israeli Jews
Israel Prize in Jewish studies recipients
Talmudists
Jews in Mandatory Palestine
Polish emigrants to Israel